St. Mary's Monastery is a monastery in Kakome, Vlorë County, Albania. It is a Cultural Monument of Albania.

Description and history
The church is a triconch (triple apse) edifice similar to the cross-and-dome models of the pre-Ottoman era. The nave and altar area are separated by a wooden iconostasis. Despite the long, narrow nave, the interior is spacious. The apses are covered by cylindrical arches opening to the central nave. The nave features four windows in the side apses, while the altar is illuminated by three more small windows. Four inner columns create a square platform on which the octagonal dome rests. The double-tiled roof is higher above the northern and southern apses. The church was built by the same craftsmen behind St. Mary's Monastery near Sarandë.

The church was painted in 1672 by Mihal Jerma. The inscription is among the earliest examples of the Albanian language written in the Greek alphabet. The church was burned by the Luftwaffe during World War II. A 500-page leather-bound copy of the Gospels was stolen then and ended up in the Louvre. The bell was donated by the King of Naples in 1695 and inscribed “Dedicated to the Captains of Lukovë” after the seat of the feudal lord of the area.

References

Churches in Albania
Cultural Monuments of Albania
Buildings and structures in Himara